The 52 members of the Parliament of Vanuatu from 1998 to 2002 were elected on 6 March 1998.

List of members

References

 1998